Mornington Island Airport  is an airport on Mornington Island, Queensland, Australia. It is to the immediate north-west of the town of Gununa. In 2006 the airport received $200,853 in funds to improve security.

Airlines and destinations

See also
 List of airports in Queensland

References

Airports in Queensland
North West Queensland
Gulf of Carpentaria
Shire of Mornington (Queensland)